Prince  was the first head of the Tokugawa clan after the overthrow of the Tokugawa bakufu, and a significant figure in Japanese politics and diplomacy during the Meiji, Taishō and early Shōwa period Japan. When Prince Tokugawa travelled to other nations representing Japan during his diplomatic journeys, he usually presented his name being Prince Iyesato Tokugawa. Prince Tokugawa held the influential position of president of Japan's upper house of congress the Diet for 30 years. Tokugawa promoted democratic principles and international goodwill. It was only after his passing in 1940 that Japanese militants were able to push Japan into joining the Axis Powers in WWII.

Early life
Tokugawa Iesato was born to the Tayasu branch of the Tokugawa clan, under the name Kamenosuke, he became its 16th head on June 19, 1868, following the resignation of the last shōgun, Tokugawa Yoshinobu. His brothers were Tokugawa Satotaka and Tokugawa Takachiyo, who also held the Tayasu headship at different times. Iesato was also briefly the daimyō of the short-lived Shizuoka Domain, before the abolition of the han system in the early 1870s. His guardian at the time was Matsudaira Naritami, the former lord of the Tsuyama Domain. He was an adopted son of the fourteenth shogun, Tokugawa Iemochi and his wife, Kazu-no-Miya Chikako or Seikan'in no Miya (although Iesato was Iemochi's adopted son they only met once. Later Iemochi's foster mother, Tenshō-in, raised Iesato). In 1866 he was sent to Edo Castle as Iemochi's son and was raised by Tenshō-in and Kazu-no-Miya Chikako. In 1868 he was sent to Kyoto by his mother, Kazu-no-Miya Chikako and met with Emperor Meiji. He married the daughter of Konoe Tadafusa, Konoe Hiroko, who bore him Iemasa Tokugawa, the seventeenth Tokugawa family head, Yasuko Tokugawa, who married Nobusuke Takatsukasa and bore him Toshimichi Takatsukasa, Ryōko Tokugawa, and Toshiko Tokugawa.

Family
 Father: Tokugawa Yoshiyori
 Mother: Takai Takeko
 Adoptive Father: Tokugawa Iemochi
 Adoptive Mother: Kazu-no-Miya Chikako
 Wife:  Konoe Hiroko (1867–1944)
 Children:
 Tokugawa Iemasa
 Tokugawa Yasuko married Nobusuke Takatsukasa
 Tokugawa Ryoko married Matsudaira Yasumasa
 Tokugawa Toshiko married Matsudaira Naokuni

Career and legacy

In 1877, Iesato was sent to Eton College in Great Britain to study. He returned to Japan in 1882, and was given the title of kōshaku (公爵, prince) under the kazoku peerage system. He became a member of the House of Peers of the Diet of Japan from its creation in 1890, and served as President of the House of Peers from 1903-1933. When the administration of Prime Minister Yamamoto Gonnohyōe was brought down by the Siemens scandal, there was a strong movement to have Tokugawa Iesato nominated to be his successor as the new Prime Minister.

Japan not only militarily supported her western allies’ in their war efforts, she also aided the Allies’ sick and wounded during and after the war.  In 1917, out of empathy for the suffering resulting from the enormous death and destruction in Europe during World War One, Prince Iyesato Tokugawa and his close friend and ally Baron Shibusawa Eiichi (aka Baron Eiichi Shibusawa) along with their other Japanese associates published a condolence booklet honoring their western allies. This 1917 condolence booklet describes the Japanese creating an association that collected a monetary fund that was given to Allied nations to help with their war related health costs. This association was headed by Prince Iyesato Tokugawa its president, and Baron Eiichi Shibusawa and S. Shimada as its vice-presidents. Many of Japan’s top leaders contributed articles to this booklet expressing their support of the Allies. This condolence booklet was published in a French and English edition. The condolence booklet was titled: Japan to her Allies: A Message of Practical Sympathy from the Japan Association for Aiding the Sick and Wounded Soldiers and Others Suffering from the War in the Allied Countries. Published in Tokyo, Japan, 1917. The illustrated biography The Art of Peace by Stan S. Katz highlights the alliance between Prince Iyesato Tokugawa and Baron Eiichi Shibusawa as they promoted democracy and international goodwill.

Following World War I, Iesato headed the Japanese delegation to the Washington Naval Conference. His support of the United States position on the 10:10:6 division of naval strength between the United States, Great Britain and Japan drew considerable wrath from the ultra-rightist movements and conservative factions within the Imperial Japanese Navy.

Iesato is remembered for having recovered the political fortunes and reputation of the Tokugawa family, holding many senior government positions before his retirement, including In 1928, being appointed as the 7th President of the Japanese Red Cross Society, head of the Japan-America Society, and President of the national organizing committee for the 1940 Olympics.

Iesato is quoted as once having said about his adoptive father: "Yoshinobu destroyed the Tokugawa house; I rebuilt it."

His grave is at the Tokugawa family cemetery at the temple of Kan'ei-ji in Ueno, Tokyo. He was succeeded by his son Tokugawa Iemasa (also known as Tokugawa Iyemasa).

In 1930, Rotary International wished to recognize and honor Prince Iyesato Tokugawa’s lifelong devotion to maintaining international goodwill by selecting him to be the Keynote speaker at their Silver (25th) Anniversary Convention celebration. There are 1930 photos available that present the founder of Rotary International, Paul Harris, along with the current President of Rotary (1929-1930) M. Eugene Newsom, introducing their Keynote speaker Prince Tokugawa to the 15,000 Rotarians attending the event from around the world.

One of Prince Tokugawa's close allies during the 1930s in the promotion of goodwill between Japan and the United States was Ambassador Joseph Grew. In 1932, Prince Tokugawa honored Grew with a reception when he first became U.S. Ambassador to Japan.

From late 1933 and into 1934, Prince Iyesato Tokugawa went on a world tour. He first arrived in the U.S. in San Francisco, California. He had only recently retired from his distinguished thirty year career as President of the Japan's upper house of congress, the House of Peers. He arrived aboard the Chichibu Maru ocean liner enroute to England. During his travels, he stated he wished to renew old friendships. Prince Tokugawa first visited America in 1882, after completing his studies in England. The Prince mentioned he looked forward to visiting the World’s Fair being held in Chicago. Besides being a pleasant vacation, Prince Tokugawa's world travels were very much directed at attempting to further strengthen Japan’s relationship with its allies in the U.S. and Europe so as to better resist a rising global militarism and fascism. While in the U.S., Prince Tokugawa delivered a radio address to the American public describing the long enduring and friendly relations between United States and Japan; he also met with President Franklin Delano Roosevelt, as well as other U.S. congressional leaders, encouraging a united front to prevent a potential upcoming war.

During his visit, Prince Iyesato Tokugawa in 1934 received an honorary Doctor of Laws degree from the University of Southern California. The president of the university, Dr. Rufus B. von KleinSmid, hands the degree to Prince Tokugawa. This presentation took place during a special luncheon given March 19, 1934 in Los Angeles, hosted by George I. Cochran, the president of the school's Board of Trustees. The Los Angeles Times<ref>{{Cite news|title=Tokugawa Honored by S.C. – Famed Japanese Visitor and Peace Advocate Given Degree Before Departing City." Main Edition, page 32.|date=March 20, 1934|work=Los Angeles Times}}</ref> stated that this honorary degree was given to Prince Tokugawa "in recognition of distinguished service in international statesmanship", and for his "support of many philanthropic and educational movements." In accepting the honor, Prince Tokugawa respectfully said, "He wished to receive it in the name of the Japanese people as a whole rather than as a personal distinction." Prince Iyesato Tokugawa was accompanied by his son Iyemasa, who was the newly appointed Minister to Canada, and by his grand-daughter Miss Toyo Tokugawa. The Los Angeles Times also stated that a banquet dinner was to be hosted that evening by the Japan-America Society of Los Angeles to honor the Prince Tokugawa's visit. The Japan-America Society of Los Angeles is part of the National Association of Japan-America Societies. The Los Angeles Times stated that California Governor James Rolph and the former Mayor of Los Angeles John C. Porter planned to attend .

References

Bibliography
 Katz, Stan S. The Emperor and the Spy, is an historical novel that honors the accomplishments of Prince Tokugawa Iesato as he strove to maintain good relations between Japan and America during the first 40 years of the 20th century. (2015 and 2017 Revised Edition) 
Banno, Junji. The Establishment of the Japanese Constitutional System. Routledge (1992). 
 Fraser, Andrew. Japan's Early Parliaments, 1890–1905. Routledge (1995). 
 Lebra, Sugiyama Takie. Above the Clouds: Status Culture of the Modern Japanese Nobility. University of California Press (1995). 
 Sims, Richard. Japanese Political History Since the Meiji Renovation 1868–2000''. Palgrave Macmillan.

External links

 Message of condolences by the British government following the death of Tokugawa, June 11, 1940, House of Lords Debates, vol. 116 cc508-9
 

Introduction to illustrated biography about Prince Tokugawa Iesato: 
 
Video presentation on U.S. Japan relations that highlights Prince Iesato Tokugawa: Osher Lifelong Learning Institute - University of California San Diego: 

|-

1863 births
1940 deaths
Kazoku
Daimyo
People from Tokyo
People of Meiji-period Japan
Tokugawa clan
Members of the House of Peers (Japan)
People educated at Eton College
Recipients of the Order of the Rising Sun with Paulownia Flowers
International Olympic Committee members
Recipients of the Order of the Plum Blossom